Hilkot is a village and union council (an administrative subdivision) of Mansehra District in the Khyber Pakhtunkhwa province of Pakistan. It is located to the north of Mansehra the district capital and south east of Batagram city and lies in an area affected by the 2005 Kashmir earthquake.
There are 04 village councils. Village Council 1. Hilkot 2. Kund Bala 3. Sathan Gali 4. Balimang. Spoken languages are Pashto, Gojri & Hindko. Major Castes are Swati & Gujjar. V/C Kund Bala & Sathan Gali have mostly people from Gujjar family which is totally hilly area while V/C Hilkot & Balimang have mostly people from Swati & Syed family. There are green field and most of land is hilly occupied with forests. Main crops are maize, wheat & little bit rice. In fruits there are Orchards & Trees of Apple, Apricot, Pear, Plums & Date-plum. Natural water rich in herbs comes from hills. The literacy rate is growing gradually. There are difficulties that the local population faces the lack of proper healthcare facilities in the area, as there are no hospitals in the region & Also there is no any Govt boys or girls college.  Mostly people moved for jobs & businesses and support their families & serving in different departments of country (in government private & public sectors) & abroad.  Farming is only way of earning but due to hilly area and weather conditions its not fulfill requirements of area.

References 

Union councils of Mansehra District
Populated places in Mansehra District